Northern Hungary is a region in Hungary. As a statistical region it includes the counties Borsod-Abaúj-Zemplén, Heves and Nógrád, but in colloquial speech it usually also refers to Szabolcs-Szatmár-Bereg county. The region is in the north-eastern part of the country. The region's centre and largest city is Miskolc.

Tourist sights

Castles
 Castle of Eger
 Castle of Diósgyőr
 Castle of Füzér
 Castle of Sárospatak

Cities and major towns
Miskolc, Eger, Salgótarján, Ózd, Kazincbarcika, Mezőkövesd, Sárospatak, Sátoraljaújhely, Tiszaújváros, Tokaj, Gyöngyös, Szerencs, Hatvan, Balassagyarmat.

Some data
 GDP (PPS) per capita

2000 : 6 774 € 

2001 : 7 519 €   845 €

2002 : 8 028 €   509 €

2003 : 8 426 €   398 €

2004 : 9 064 €   638 €

2005 : 9 321 €   257 €

2006 : 9 572 €   251 €

2007 : 9 981 €   409 €

Fertility rate

2000 : 1,54 births/woman 	 	 	 	 	 	 	 	 	

2001 : 1,47 births/woman 

2002 : 1,45 births/woman 

2003 : 1,41 births/woman 

2004 : 1,42 births/woman 

2005 : 1,44 births/woman 

2006 : 1,49 births/woman 

2007 : 1,45 births/woman 

2008 : 1,49 births/woman 

2009 : 1,47 births/woman 

Unemployment rate, %

2000 : 10,1 %  	 	 	 	 	 	 	 	

2001 : 8,5% 

2002 : 8,8% 

2003 : 9,7% 

2004 : 9,7% 

2005 : 10,6% 

2006 : 11,0% 

2007 : 12,3% 

2008 : 13,4% 

2009 : 15,3% 

 Life expectancy

Men :

2000: 66,20 year  	 	 	 	 	 	 	 	

2001: 66,73 year 

2002: 66,68 year 

2003: 66,68 year 

2004: 66,97 year 

2005: 66,84 year 

2006: 67,37 year 

2007: 67,54 year 

2008: 67,90 year 

2009: 68,37 year 

Women :

2000 : 75,25 year 	 	 	 	 	 	 	 	

2001 : 76,26 year 

2002 : 76,00 year 

2003 : 75,84 year 

2004 : 75,80 year 

2005 : 75,93 year 

2006 : 76,39 year 

2007 : 76,43 year 

2008 : 77,05 year 

2009 : 76,70 year

See also
List of regions of Hungary
NUTS of Hungary

References

External links
 
 Official site of the Region of Northern Hungary

 
NUTS 2 statistical regions of the European Union